Lexington and Covington Turnpike Toll House is a historic toll house located at Lexington, Virginia.  The original section was built about 1834, as a two-room brick structure.  A board-and-batten frame was added between 1865 and 1867.  Two additional rooms were added to the original structure in the 1870s, forming a "U"-shape.  In 1887, a Victorian style front porch was added to the original brick structure.  The house was sheathed in weatherboard in 1904, and an addition filling in the "U" was added. The house was rehabilitated between 1997 and 2004. Also on the property are the contributing ruins of a spring house.  The building housed a toll house into the 1850s, then became a dwelling.

It was listed on the National Register of Historic Places in 2004.

References

Houses on the National Register of Historic Places in Virginia
Victorian architecture in Virginia
Houses completed in 1834
Houses in Lexington, Virginia
National Register of Historic Places in Lexington, Virginia
Toll houses on the National Register of Historic Places